The following streets are called Lincoln Boulevard:
Lincoln Boulevard (Oklahoma City), Oklahoma
Lincoln Boulevard (Los Angeles County)
 Lincoln Boulevard (Omaha), Nebraska
 Lincoln Boulevard (Cleveland Heights), Ohio